Tinahely is a village in County Wicklow in Ireland. It is a market town in the valley of the River Derry, a tributary of the River Slaney.

Location and access 
It is located on the R747 road which links the west Wicklow town of Baltinglass with Arklow on the east coast. The village is situated near the southern point of the Wicklow Way which winds through the Wicklow Mountains. The River Derry runs through the village.

History 
The town of Tinahely is part of the civil parish of Kilcommon in the ancient barony of Ballinacor South. Most of the village dates from the early part of the 19th century as it was rebuilt by Lord Fitzwilliam after it was burnt during the 1798 rebellion. The Fiztwilliam family lived in nearby Coolattin House. The Coollattin estate once comprised , had 20,000 tenants and occupied almost a quarter of County Wicklow.

Parish church 
Tinahely's parish church, St. Kevin's church, lies 2 km to the east of the village in the townland of Kilaveny overlooking the valley of the Derry stream. The church was erected in 1843 when it replaced another structure located in the adjacent townland of Whitefield which had been burned down on 11 November 1798 by Yeomen soldiers in reprisal for local activity during the 1798 Rebellion. The Whitefield church was replaced by a temporary wooden structure until the erection of St. Kevin's church. The original structure had been erected during the Penal Laws in 1700 and was cruciform in style with two transepts and a nave. Nothing now remains of the original church except for the cemetery that was attached to it. No burials have taken place in the cemetery since the mid 1900s. In the Jubilee Year 2000, parishioners erected a carved commemorative limestone marker on the site of the original church, in the present Whitefield Cemetery, setting out the above history.

Amenities and events 
The Courthouse Arts Centre, Dwyer Square, formerly the civil courthouse building hosts musical performances, artist exhibitions, plays and film screenings. The building was restored by a committee of local people with help from FÁS. The local public library, also in Dwyer Square, was formerly the town's market house. There is also a community center located on grounds of original national school on School Road.

Churches in the area include St. Kevin's Church, Kilavaney (Roman Catholic), St. Peter & St. Paul Church, Crossbridge (a Roman Catholic sub-parish of Kilaveney), and Kilcommon Church, Parish of Crosspatrick and Carnew Group (Church of Ireland).

There is a walking route along the line of a former railway which leads from Tinahely to Tomnafinnoge Oak Wood in the nearby town of Shillelagh. Three circular waymarked trails were also opened in 2010, and Tinahely is close to the Wicklow Way, one of Ireland's most popular long-distance trails.

The Tinahely Agricultural Show takes place annually on the first Monday of August (a bank holiday in the Republic of Ireland). This one-day show is held at Fairwood Park and has been running for over 70 years.

Sport 
Tinahely GAA club was established in 1886. The club plays in St Kevin's Park which opened in May 1978. The club colours are red and white. In 1984 the club became the first club from Wicklow to reach the final of the Leinster Senior Club Football Championship but was beaten by St Vincents GAA.

The local Triathlon club run a Duathlon every year on the Sunday of the May Bank Holiday.

Transport

Rail transport
Tinahely railway station opened on 22 May 1865, closed for passenger and goods traffic on 24 April 1944 and finally closed altogether on 20 April 1945.

Bus transport
The Wicklow Way bus service serves Tinahely on a daily basis (must be booked in advance) and links with Dublin trains at Rathdrum railway station. Bus Éireann route 132 (Rosslare Europort - Dublin serves Tinahely on Thursdays once in each direction linking to Baltinglass, Tallaght, Carnew and Wexford.

People
 Sebastian Barry, playwright, novelist and poet, lives near Tinahely.
 Noel Vincent Willoughby, former Bishop of Cashel and Ossory, born in Tinahely.
 Dermot Troy, lyric tenor, born in Tinahely.

See also 
 List of towns and villages in Ireland
 Market Houses in Ireland

References

External links 
 Tinahely website
 Tinahely GAA club history
 Courthouse Arts Centre website
 Tinahely at the Wicklow Tourism website
 Tinahely GAA information at the Wicklow GAA website
 Tinahely Agricultural Show website
 Kilavaney Parish, Roman Catholic Church
 Crosspatrick & Carnew parish, Church of Ireland

Towns and villages in County Wicklow